List of members of the Senate for the 77th West Virginia Legislature

Leadership of the 77th West Virginia Senate

List of Members of the 77th West Virginia Senate by District

See also 
West Virginia Senate
List of members of the 78th West Virginia Senate

External links 
West Virginia Legislature Homepage
Senate District Map

West Virginia Senate 77th
West Virginia legislative sessions